Kristjan Čeh (born 17 February 1999) is a Slovenian athlete specialising in the discus throw. He won the gold medal at the 2022 World Athletics Championships, setting a championship record in the process. Čeh placed second at the 2022 European Championships.

Career
He represented his country at the 2019 World Athletics Championships without qualifying for the final. Earlier that year he won a gold medal at the European U23 Championships in Gävle, Sweden.

His personal best in the event was 68.75 metres set in Maribor in 2020, until he improved it with 69.52 m (National record) at Mestni stadion, in Ptuj, on 27 May 2021. This was the European U23 Record, before he improved it with 70.35 m in Kuortane (FIN) on 26 June 2021. He again improved his personal best with 71.27 m in Birmingham (GBR) on 21 May 2022.

Since February 2022, he has been coached by Olympic champion Gerd Kanter.

International competitions

References

External links

 

1999 births
Living people
Slovenian male discus throwers
World Athletics Championships athletes for Slovenia
Athletes (track and field) at the 2018 Mediterranean Games
Mediterranean Games medalists in athletics
Mediterranean Games silver medalists for Slovenia
Athletes (track and field) at the 2020 Summer Olympics
Olympic athletes of Slovenia
People from Ptuj
20th-century Slovenian people
21st-century Slovenian people
European Athletics Championships medalists